In mathematics, the Macdonald identities are some infinite product identities associated to affine root systems, introduced by .

 and  pointed out that the Macdonald identities are the analogs of the Weyl denominator formula for affine Kac–Moody algebras and superalgebras.

References

Lie algebras
Mathematical identities
Infinite products